League Sunday is an RTÉ2 Gaelic games television show hosted by Michael Lyster, featuring highlights from the National Football League and the National Hurling League. It began on 13 February 2011, at 8:00pm as a replacement highlights show for Sunday Sport.

Analysts

Seán Cavanagh
Oisín McConville
Colm O'Rourke
 Ken McGrath and Jackie Tyrrell

References

2011 Irish television series debuts
Gaelic games on television
RTÉ Sport
RTÉ original programming